Madera, also known as Ciudad Madera, is a town and seat of the municipality of Madera in the mountains of the northwestern Mexican state of Chihuahua. As of 2010, the city of Madera had a population of 15,447, up from 15,267 as of 2005.

It is a logging town, located in the mountains and the lumber industry is still very important. 
Madera is Spanish for "wood", and there used to be a large U.S. company with large lumber mills, there is still a section of the city called "barrio americano" where some American-style wooden houses still survive.  New manufacturing industries have created new employment for the residents.

It is at 2,112 metres (6,929 ft) above sea level and was founded in 1906.

The town is located 276 kilometres northwest of the state capital, Chihuahua, and 536 km southwest of Ciudad Juárez on the U.S. border.

History 
Madera has been the starting point of the Cabalgata Binacional Villista (see cavalcade).

Madera is also the place where on September 23, 1965, a guerrilla attack on the military took place; this gave the name to the "Liga 23 de Septiembre," an urban socialist guerrilla group that took the name to commemorate what they considered their martyrs.

Religion 
From 25 April 1966 it was the seat of the Territorial Prelature of Madera; after that was promoted to Diocese of Cuauhtémoc-Madera, with a cathedral in its new see Cuauhtémoc, Madera's San Pedro church, dedicated to Saint Peter, was given the status of co-cathedral.

Geography 
Madera is surrounded by the great Sierra Madre mountains (southern stretch of the Rocky Mountains in Canada and USA).

Climate 
Madera’s high altitude gives it a subtropical highland climate (Köppen climate classification: Cwb), characterised by warm, wet summers and dry winters with cold nights. Frost occurs most mornings from October to April, but daytime temperatures rise to double digits Celsius. Snow falls on about 7 days per year on average (more often on mountain peaks).

References

Populated places in Chihuahua (state)
Populated places established in 1906
1906 establishments in Mexico